Andrew Salako (born 8 November 1972) is a Nigerian former professional footballer who played in the Football League, as a defender. He is the brother of former England international John Salako.

References

1972 births
Living people
Association football defenders
Nigerian footballers
Nigerian emigrants to the United Kingdom
Sportspeople from Lagos
Yoruba sportspeople
Charlton Athletic F.C. players
Welling United F.C. players
Bromley F.C. players
Carshalton Athletic F.C. players
Sutton United F.C. players
Bishop's Stortford F.C. players
Horsham F.C. players
English Football League players
National League (English football) players
Croydon F.C. players